Igor Judge, Baron Judge,  (born 19 May 1941) is an English former judge who served as the Lord Chief Justice of England and Wales, the head of the judiciary, from 2008 to 2013. He was previously President of the Queen's Bench Division, at the time a newly created post assuming responsibilities transferred from the office of Lord Chief Justice. In 2019, he became Convenor of the Crossbench peers in the House of Lords.

Early life and education
Judge was born in Malta to Raymond and Rosa Judge (née Micallef). Judge was educated at St. Edward's College, Malta, from 1947 to 1954 and The Oratory School in Woodcote in Oxfordshire from 1954 to 1959, where he was Captain of School and Captain of Cricket. He was awarded an Open Exhibition to study History and Law at Magdalene College, Cambridge in 1959, and he graduated BA in 1962.

Legal career
He was called to the bar (Middle Temple) in 1963 and became a Recorder in 1976 and Queen's Counsel in 1979. From 1980 to 1986, he served on the Professional Conduct Committee of the Bar Council. In 1987, he was elected Leader of the Midland Circuit. On 10 October 1988, Judge was appointed a Justice of the High Court, assigned to the Queen's Bench Division, and awarded the customary knighthood. He was appointed a Lord Justice of Appeal, a judge of the Court of Appeal, on 4 June 1996, becoming a Privy Counsellor.

He was the Senior Presiding Judge from 1998 to 2003, when he became Deputy Chief Justice. He was not appointed as Lord Chief Justice following the retirement of Lord Woolf in 2005 despite having served as his deputy. The Lord Phillips of Worth Matravers, then Master of the Rolls, was appointed instead.

He was appointed as the first President of the Queen's Bench Division on 3 October 2005, when that post was split from that of Lord Chief Justice. In addition to that role, Judge was appointed Head of Criminal Justice in January 2007.

Judge replaced Lord Phillips as Lord Chief Justice on 1 October 2008. The same day, he was created a life peer as Baron Judge, of Draycote in the county of Warwickshire, and he was introduced in the House of Lords five days later, where he sits as a crossbencher.

In 2007 Lord Judge was awarded an honorary doctorate from Nottingham Trent University, and in 2010 was made an Honorary Fellow of Aberystwyth University as well as Kingston University. On 20 June 2012 he received an honorary doctorate from Cambridge.

He retired as Lord Chief Justice at the end of September 2013. He was Treasurer to the Middle Temple for the year 2014.

As of November 2013, Lord Judge has served as a Distinguished Visitor to The Dickson Poon School of Law at King's College London.

Parliament

Judge succeeded Lord Hope of Craighead as Convenor of the Crossbench Peers in 2019.

Personal life
Judge has a son and two daughters. Helen was born in 1966 and married Timothy Noble in 1991. She gave birth to daughters Lucinda (1994) and Amelia (1996). Alastair was born in 1968 and married Kate Holcroft in 1998. Their own children are Cecelia (2005) and Benedict (2006).  Emma was born in 1970.

Arms

References

1941 births
Living people
21st-century Roman Catholics
Alumni of Magdalene College, Cambridge
21st-century English judges
British people of Maltese descent
English King's Counsel
British Roman Catholics
Crossbench life peers
English Roman Catholics
Knights Bachelor
Lord chief justices of England and Wales
Members of the Middle Temple
Members of the Privy Council of the United Kingdom
People educated at The Oratory School
Presidents of the Queen's Bench Division
20th-century King's Counsel
Lords Justices of Appeal
20th-century English judges
Life peers created by Elizabeth II